Top Country Albums is a chart that ranks the top-performing country music albums in the United States, published by Billboard.  In 2018, 19 different albums topped the chart, based on multi-metric consumption, blending traditional album sales, track equivalent albums, and streaming equivalent albums.

In the issue of Billboard dated January 3, Luke Bryan was at number one with the album What Makes You Country, its second week in the top spot.  The following week it was displaced by The Anthology Part I: The First Five Years by Garth Brooks, in an issue which was dated January 6 after Billboard changed its issue dating system.  One week after that, Kane Brown returned to number one with his eponymous debut album, which had spent a single week in the top spot in 2016 and a second in 2017.  The album's total of 10 non-consecutive weeks atop the chart was the second highest achieved in 2018, and its second spell at number one, which lasted for four weeks, tied for the year's longest unbroken run in the top spot.  Later in the year Brown's second album Experiment spent a single week at number one, making him the only act with more than one chart-topper in 2018.  The band Lanco matched the feat which Brown had achieved in 2016 by topping the chart with its debut album, spending a single week at number one in January with Hallelujah Nights.

In June, the album This One's for You by Luke Combs returned to number one; it had spent four weeks in the top spot following its original release the previous summer, but went back to the peak position a year later following the release of a deluxe edition with additional tracks.  The album made intermittent returns to number one throughout the remainder of the year, adding a further 17 weeks to its total.  Its popularity would continue for much of 2019, and it would eventually achieve a total of 50 weeks atop the listing, tying the record set by Shania Twain's album Come On Over for the highest total number of weeks at number one on the Top Country Albums chart.  Three of 2018's Top Country Albums number ones also topped the all-genre Billboard 200 chart: Jason Aldean's Rearview Town, Carrie Underwood's Cry Pretty, and Kane Brown's Experiment.

Chart history

See also
2018 in music
List of number-one country singles of 2018 (U.S.)

References

2018
United States Country Albums